The Torneo Clausura 2006 was the football (soccer) tournament that closed the season in the Paraguayan first division in the year 2006.

The tournament began on July 14 and ended on December 3 with the participation of 11 teams, with a two-legged all play all system. The winner was Cerro Porteño, which  gained the right to play the Copa Libertadores 2007 and the national championship final against Libertad (winners of the 2006 Apertura).

Final positions

Results

{| class="wikitable" style="text-align:center; float:left; margin-right:1em;"
|-
!colspan=3 |Matchday 1
|-
!width="170"|Home Team
!width="60"|Result
!width="170"|Away Team

{| class="wikitable" style="text-align:center; float:left; margin-right:1em;"
|-
!colspan=3 |Matchday 2
|-
!width="170"|Home Team
!width="60"|Result
!width="170"|Away Team

{| class="wikitable" style="text-align:center; float:left; margin-right:1em;"
|-
!colspan=3 |Matchday 3
|-
!width="170"|Home Team
!width="60"|Result
!width="170"|Away Team

{| class="wikitable" style="text-align:center; float:left; margin-right:1em;"
|-
!colspan=3 |Matchday 4
|-
!width="170"|Home Team
!width="60"|Result
!width="170"|Away Team

{| class="wikitable" style="text-align:center; float:left; margin-right:1em;"
|-
!colspan=3 |Matchday 5
|-
!width="170"|Home Team
!width="60"|Result
!width="170"|Away Team

{| class="wikitable" style="text-align:center; float:left; margin-right:1em;"
|-
!colspan=3 |Matchday 6
|-
!width="170"|Home Team
!width="60"|Result
!width="170"|Away Team

{| class="wikitable" style="text-align:center; float:left; margin-right:1em;"
|-
!colspan=3 |Matchday 7
|-
!width="170"|Home Team
!width="60"|Result
!width="170"|Away Team

{| class="wikitable" style="text-align:center; float:left; margin-right:1em;"
|-
!colspan=3 |Matchday 8
|-
!width="170"|Home Team
!width="60"|Result
!width="170"|Away Team

{| class="wikitable" style="text-align:center; float:left; margin-right:1em;"
|-
!colspan=3 |Matchday 9
|-
!width="170"|Home Team
!width="60"|Result
!width="170"|Away Team

{| class="wikitable" style="text-align:center; float:left; margin-right:1em;"
|-
!colspan=3 |Matchday 10
|-
!width="170"|Home Team
!width="60"|Result
!width="170"|Away Team

{| class="wikitable" style="text-align:center; float:left; margin-right:1em;"
|-
!colspan=3 |Matchday 11
|-
!width="170"|Home Team
!width="60"|Result
!width="170"|Away Team

{| class="wikitable" style="text-align:center; float:left; margin-right:1em;"
|-
!colspan=3 |Matchday 12
|-
!width="170"|Home Team
!width="60"|Result
!width="170"|Away Team

{| class="wikitable" style="text-align:center; float:left; margin-right:1em;"
|-
!colspan=3 |Matchday 13
|-
!width="170"|Home Team
!width="60"|Result
!width="170"|Away Team

{| class="wikitable" style="text-align:center; float:left; margin-right:1em;"
|-
!colspan=3 |Matchday 14
|-
!width="170"|Home Team
!width="60"|Result
!width="170"|Away Team
|-

{| class="wikitable" style="text-align:center; float:left; margin-right:1em;"
|-
!colspan=3 |Matchday 15
|-
!width="170"|Home Team
!width="60"|Result
!width="170"|Away Team

{| class="wikitable" style="text-align:center; float:left; margin-right:1em;"
|-
!colspan=3 |Matchday 16
|-
!width="170"|Home Team
!width="60"|Result
!width="170"|Away Team

{| class="wikitable" style="text-align:center; float:left; margin-right:1em;"
|-
!colspan=3 |Matchday 17
|-
!width="170"|Home Team
!width="60"|Result
!width="170"|Away Team

{| class="wikitable" style="text-align:center; float:left; margin-right:1em;"
|-
!colspan=3 |Matchday 18
|-
!width="170"|Home Team
!width="60"|Result
!width="170"|Away Team
|-

{| class="wikitable" style="text-align:center; float:left; margin-right:1em;"
|-
!colspan=3 |Matchday 19
|-
!width="170"|Home Team
!width="60"|Result
!width="170"|Away Team
|-

{| class="wikitable" style="text-align:center; float:left; margin-right:1em;"
|-
!colspan=3 |Matchday 20
|-
!width="170"|Home Team
!width="60"|Result
!width="170"|Away Team

{| class="wikitable" style="text-align:center; float:left; margin-right:1em;"
|-
!colspan=3 |Matchday 21
|-
!width="170"|Home Team
!width="60"|Result
!width="170"|Away Team

{| class="wikitable" style="text-align:center; float:left; margin-right:1em;"
|-
!colspan=3 |Matchday 22
|-
!width="170"|Home Team
!width="60"|Result
!width="170"|Away Team

Top scorers

See also
2006 in Paraguayan football

External links
Asociación Paraguaya de Fútbol Website
Paraguay 2006 at RSSSF

Clausura